Merlusse is a 1935 French comedy drama film written and directed by Marcel Pagnol and starring Henri Poupon, André Pollack and Annie Toinon. It was shot at the Lycée Thiers in Marseille, which Pagnol had himself once attended. It should not be confused with the Merlusse fairy, a depiction of Melusine in the Vosges (France).

Synopsis
A tough teacher charged with looking after the students left behind at a boarding school during the Christmas holidays rises to the challenge and comes to better understand the boys in his care.

Cast
 Henri Poupon as Blanchard dit Merlusse 
 André Pollack as Le proviseur 
 Annie Toinon as Nathalie 
 Thommeray as Le censeur 
 Jean Castan as Galubert 
 Le Petit Jacques as Villepontoux 
 d'Armans as Philippard 
 Fernand Bruno as Catusse 
 Robert Aviérinos as Lupin 
 Robert Chaux as Godard 
 Dernard as Delacre 
 John Dubrou as Pic 
 Jean Inglesakis as Molinard 
 Le-Van-Kim as Macaque 
 Rellys as L'appariteur 
 André Robert as Le surveillant général 
 Armando Rossi as Le concierge

Reception
Writing for The Spectator in 1936, Graham Greene gave the film a good review, describing it simply as "a slightly sentimental tale". Greene praises Poupon in his portrayal of Merlusse, and expresses admiration for Pagnol's "simpleness, [and] directness".

References

Bibliography 
 Martin Garrett. Provence: A Cultural History. Andrews UK Limited, 2012.
 John J. Michalczyk. The French literary filmmakers. Art Alliance Press, 1980.

External links 
 

1935 films
1935 comedy films
French comedy films
1930s French-language films
Films directed by Marcel Pagnol
Films set in Marseille
1930s French films